is an Earth-crossing asteroid belonging to the Apollo family of asteroids which also crosses the orbit of Mars.  1999 JT6 is the asteroid's temporary discovery name.  It has now been assigned a permanent number from the Minor Planet Center (31669) indicating that its orbit has been confirmed, but has not (at least so far) been assigned a name.  Only a small fraction of asteroids have been named.

It has an Earth minimum orbit intersection distance of 0.00354 AU (328,978 miles), which is close enough to classify it as a potentially hazardous asteroid (PHA).  It will make a close approach to Earth on 14 December 2076 at 0.0260 AU (2,506,321 miles) and an even closer approach to the minor planet Ceres on 16 Feb 2084 at 0.0171 AU (1,587,064 miles).

References

External links 
 
 
 

031669
031669
031669
031669
19990512